Aeluroglena is a genus of snake in the family Colubridae  that contains the sole species Aeluroglena cucullata. It is commonly known as the Somali snake.

It is found in Somalia and Ethiopia.

References 

Colubrids
Monotypic snake genera
Reptiles described in 1898
Reptiles of Somalia
Reptiles of Ethiopia